Love Attack is the eighteenth studio album by American Soul musician Isaac Hayes. The album was released on September 20, 1988, by Columbia/CBS Records. It features a new version of Jerry Butler's "I Stand Accused", which Hayes already covered on his 1970 album The Isaac Hayes Movement and a cover of Billy Joel’s "She's Got a Way". Like the previous album U-Turn, Love Attack features mainly synthesizers and drum machines, and the same team of musicians including Gerald Jackson and Bill Mueller.

Track listing

Personnel
Isaac Hayes – vocal, synthesizers, acoustic piano, computer programming
Gerald Jackson – synthesizers, drum machine programming
Bill Mueller  – guitar
Ronnie Garrett – bass guitar
Myra Walker and Brenda Jones William – backing vocals
Produced and arranged by Isaac Hayes
Recorded and mixed by Ron Christopher
Mastered by Glen Meadows
Cover design & photos Allen Weinberg and William Coupon

References

1988 albums
Isaac Hayes albums
albums produced by Isaac Hayes
Columbia Records albums